Mount Wallace is a 13,377-foot-elevation (4,077 meter) mountain summit located on the crest of the Sierra Nevada mountain range in northern California, United States. It is situated on the shared boundary of Kings Canyon National Park with John Muir Wilderness, and along the common border of Fresno County with Inyo County.
Mount Wallace ranks as the 79th-highest summit in California, and the ninth-highest in the Evolution Region.

History
In 1895, Sierra Club explorer Theodore S. Solomons named a group of mountains in the Sierra Nevada after exponents of Darwin's theory of evolution. These six peaks are now known collectively as the Evolution Group. Solomons wrote: "At a distance of two miles it [the wall of Mount Darwin] rises perpendicularly five or six hundred feet, forming Mt. Haeckel, and a mile beyond again rises several hundred feet higher, though not quite so sharply, forming the peak called Mt. Wallace... Next morning [July 16, 1895] we climbed Mt. Wallace." This mountain is named for Alfred Russel Wallace (1823–1913), a British naturalist, explorer, geographer, anthropologist, and biologist who is best known for developing the theory of evolution contemporaneously with Darwin. The other five peaks were named after Charles Darwin, John Fiske, Ernst Haeckel, Herbert Spencer, and Thomas Henry Huxley.

The 1895 climb by Theodore Solomons and party was the first ascent of the summit.

Climate
Mount Wallace is located in an alpine climate zone. Most weather fronts originate in the Pacific Ocean, and travel east toward the Sierra Nevada mountains. As fronts approach, they are forced upward by the peaks, causing them to drop their moisture in the form of rain or snowfall onto the range (orographic lift). Precipitation runoff from this mountain drains northeast into Bishop Creek, and west into Evolution Creek, which is a San Joaquin River tributary.

Gallery

See also

 List of the major 4000-meter summits of California

References

External links
 Weather forecast: Mount Wallace

Inyo National Forest
Mountains of Inyo County, California
Mountains of Fresno County, California
Mountains of Kings Canyon National Park
Mountains of the John Muir Wilderness
North American 4000 m summits
Mountains of Northern California
Sierra Nevada (United States)